Avermitilol synthase (EC 4.2.3.96) is an enzyme with systematic name avermitilol hydrolase (cyclizing, avermitilol-forming). This enzyme catalyses the following chemical reaction

 (2E,6E)-farnesyl diphosphate + H2O  avermitilol + diphosphate

This enzyme requires Mg2+.

References

External links 
 

EC 4.2.3